ACS Sustainable Chemistry & Engineering is a weekly peer-reviewed scientific journal published by the American Chemical Society. It covers research in green chemistry, green engineering, biomass, alternative energy, and life cycle assessment. According to Journal Citation Reports, the journal has an impact factor of 9.224 in 2021. In 2022 the Editor-in-Chief is David T. Allen (University of Texas, Austin).

Article types
The journal invites letters, articles, features, and perspectives (reviews) that address challenges of sustainability in the chemical enterprise and advance principles of green chemistry and green engineering.

References 

Chemical engineering journals
Publications established in 2013
American Chemical Society academic journals
Biweekly journals
English-language journals